In a Bar, Under the Sea is the second studio album by Belgian rock band Deus. The cover art was designed by guitarist Rudy Trouvé. The original Belgian release was by Bang!, with the only difference that track 14 is simply named "Roses", like the single.

The album was produced by Eric Drew Feldman (who was keyboard and bass player for Captain Beefheart in the late seventies and early eighties) and welcomes guests such as Scott McCloud from Girls Against Boys (on Fell Off the Floor, Man), Dana Colley from Morphine (on Supermarketsong) and Bart Maris from X-Legged Sally (on Nine Threads).

In a Bar, Under the Sea reached Gold in Belgium (selling over 25,000 copies) and sold around 250,000 copies worldwide.

Track listing

Personnel

dEUS

 Stef Kamil Carlens: vocal, guitar, bass, double bass, percussion, claps
 Tom Barman: vocal, guitar, Hammond, Talkback, samples, percussion, synthesiser, cma^s
 Jules de Borgher: drums, percussion, bells, claps
 Craig Ward: vocal, guitar, sax, mandolin, claps, ukulele, slide guitar
 Klaas Janzoons: vocal, percussion, Talkback, piano, violin, synthesiser, beatbox, claps
 Rudy Trouvé: vocal, piccolo, harmonica, guitar, ukulele

guest musicians

 Didier Fontaine: Vocal
 Scott McCloud: "philosophy"
 Eric Drew Feldman: Hammond, percussion, egg, piano
 Pieter Lamot: trombone
 Ian Humphries: violin
 Charles Mutter: violin
 Nic Pendlebury: viola
 Deirdre Cooper: cello
 Dana Colley: saxophones
 Vincienne: claps
 Jim Brumby: claps, rate and depth
 Piet Jorens: piano, gong
 Bart Maris: trumpet

Singles
 "Theme from Turnpike" (June 1996)- #68 UK
 "Little Arithmetics" (October 1996)- #44 UK
 "For the Roses" (December 1996)- #56 UK
 "Fell Off the Floor, Man" - Belgian only single (June 1997)

Charts references: https://www.officialcharts.com/

References

Deus (band) albums
1996 albums
Island Records albums